Allodontichthys is a genus of splitfins, endemic to the Tuxpan (Coahuayana), Armería and Ameca river basins in Colima and Jalisco, west–central Mexico.

Species
There are currently four recognized species in this genus:
 Allodontichthys hubbsi R. R. Miller & Uyeno, 1980 (Whitepatched splitfin)
 Allodontichthys polylepis Rauchengerger, 1988 (Finescale splitfin)
 Allodontichthys tamazulae C. L. Turner, 1946 (Tuxpan splitfin)
 Allodontichthys zonistius (C. L. Hubbs, 1932) (Bandfin splitfin)

References

Goodeinae
Freshwater fish of Mexico
Endemic fish of Mexico
Natural history of Colima
Natural history of Jalisco
Freshwater fish genera
Taxa named by Carl Leavitt Hubbs
Ray-finned fish genera